Sylvain E. Lesné (born 1974) is a French neuroscientist and associate professor at the Department of Neuroscience at the University of Minnesota (UMN) Medical School, known for his research into Alzheimer's disease. He is the primary author of a 2006 Nature paper that is foundational in the hypothesis that one specific toxic oligomer of the amyloid beta protein, known as Aβ*56, is a cause of memory impairment in Alzheimer's, aligned with the prevailing amyloid hypothesis.

As of July 2022, Lesné's work in the 2006 publication and others is being investigated on charges that he manipulated images to inflate the role of Aβ*56 in Alzheimer's. Responses from other researchers indicate that, while the allegations are of significant concern, the overall impact on amyloid research is small and most Alzheimer's research is not compromised.

Personal life and education 
Sylvain E. Lesné was born in 1974 and raised in Luc-sur-Mer, a small town in the Normandy region in northwestern France. His parents are Bertrand and Marie Carmen Lesné.

Lesné holds a master's degree in biochemistry and has a PhD with a major in neuroscience from the University of Caen Normandy. His doctoral thesis (2002) was "Régulation d'expression et du métabolisme d'APP au cours des pathologies dégénératives" (Regulation of APP expression and metabolism during degenerative pathologies).

Jill Caroline, a Minnesota psychologist and special educator, and Lesné were married in Beauvoir-sur-Mer, France on August 14, 2010.

Early career 
Denis Vivien, a French cell biologist and neuroscience professor who oversaw Lesné's doctoral work and published with Lesné, says Lesné produced some immunostaining images which Vivien thought suspect; others were unable to replicate Lesné's data.  Vivien withdrew a paper that was to be published with Lesné, and told Le Monde in 2022 that he had long ago ceased having any personal or scientific contact with Lesné.

University of Minnesota 
After graduating from university, Lesné was hired in 2002 as a post-doctoral research associate  by Karen Ashe at the University of Minnesota.  Ashe was described by the Minneapolis Star Tribune as a "distinguished professor considered by many to be on the short list for a Nobel Prize for her work". Ashe in turn has described Lesné as her "brilliant postdoctoral fellow"; he had developed a means of measuring amyloid beta (Aβ) oligomer proteins which could be injected into rats.

Since 2009, Lesné has had a laboratory at the UMN funded by National Institutes of Health (NIH). He received $774,000 in NIH grants to study Aβ*56 through 2012, in addition to over $7 million for Alzheimer's research through 2022, according to the Star Tribune.

Lesné was named an Associate Professor in the Neuroscience Department in 2016, and given tenure according to the Lesné Lab website. He was an associate director at the UMN's N. Bud Grossman Center for Memory Research and Care, where Ashe serves as director. He is a scholar at the UMN's Institute for Translational Neuroscience as of 2022.

Alzheimer's research 
Lesné is the lead author, with Ashe and others as co-authors, on an influential 2006 report published in Nature. The paper, "A specific amyloid-β protein assembly in the brain impairs memory", suggested the Aβ*56 oligomer (known as amyloid beta star 56 and Abeta*56) as a cause of Alzheimer's disease. The 2006 study proposed that Aβ*56 was responsible for the memory deficits that occur in Alzheimer's. According to the Star Tribune, images from the study showed the Aβ*56 protein growing as mice began to decline and age with dementia.

Science says it was the fifth-highest cited paper in Alzheimer's research as of early 2022, with approximately 2,300 other articles citing it. The Guardian says the paper was "highly influential" and calls it "one of the most cited pieces of Alzheimer's disease research in the last two decades", writing that it has "dominated the field" of research.  The Atlantic likens publication in Nature to a "career high-water mark", reflecting especially important findings. The Daily Telegraph states that the "seminal research paper" led to increased drug research funding worldwide.

Lesné was listed as of May 13, 2022 at UMN Medical School's Wall of Scholarship recognizing faculty who "must have first or last author credits on a publication that has been cited at least 1,000 times".

Other scientists have not been able to replicate the results specific to Aβ*56 and whether it exists is questioned; several Alzheimer's researchers stated in July 2022 on the website Alzforum that they have long been skeptical of the Aβ*56 findings.

2022 investigation 
A July 2022 publication in Science authored by Charles Piller questioned the authenticity of Western blot images used in Lesné's research; Piller's report alleges, based on a six-month investigation, that images may have been doctored to emphasize the role of Aβ*56 in Alzheimer's. Matthew Schrag, a Vanderbilt University neuroscientist, raised concerns in a whistleblower report that images were falsified, casting doubt on the association between the Aβ*56 protein and dementia symptoms. Schrag told USA Today the images had similarities to what one would expect from software like Photoshop.

The editors of Nature responded with a July 14, 2022 note stating they were aware of and investigating the concerns raised, that a "further editorial response [would] follow as soon as possible", and that "readers are advised to use caution when using results reported therein". The NIH, where Schrag lodged the whistleblower report, is also investigating the matter, and could decide to pass it on the United States Office of Research Integrity if the complaints are found valid.

Lesné is the leading researcher overseeing or instigating the work in about ten disputed studies. Another journal, Science Signaling, has issued two expressions of concern, and two other journals,The Journal of Neuroscience and Brain, have issued corrections on articles associated with Lesné and his UMN co-workers. Retraction Watch states that Ashe co-authored some of the disputed papers, and that the authors in the disputed work do not overlap except for two from UMN Department of Neuroscience. On the corrected paper in Brain, Ashe and Lesné are the senior and first authors. Piller did not find the same image inconsistencies in other work published by Ashe or Vivien without Lesné as a co-author.

UMN is investigating the reports as of July 2022.

Alzheimer's researcher John Forsayeth commented that Ashe had been guilty of a "major ethical lapse" in oversight of data and Dennis Selkoe, a Harvard Medical School neurologist, said he did not understand how Ashe failed to "hyperscrutinize" data considering reactions to the 2006 Nature report.  Piller writes that Lesné's work was already being queried before his investigation, when other researchers were unable to replicate the results.

As of July 30, 2022, Lesné had not commented. Ashe had declined to comment on the investigation conducted by the UMN, but she stated via email that "it is devastating to discover that a colleague may have misled me and the scientific community ... [it is also] distressing that a major scientific journal has blatantly misrepresented the implications of my work." The Daily Telegraph states that the "authors of the Minnesota paper have defended their original findings" and support the role of amyloid as a cause of Alzheimer's. USA Today reported that Ashe had started the process to retract the Nature paper, but that had not been done as of July 29, 2022 because six of the eight co-authors will not sign off on the request. She stated via email that "... the figures in question were manipulated in a way that made them look nicer but did not affect one word in the paper". Defending the work, she said that the image adjustments "should not have occurred", but called them "non-material" and "inconsequential" to the research overall.

Impact on Alzheimer's research 
If studies were manipulated, Jeremy Olson stated in the Star Tribune that "thinking on the causes of the disease and dementia" could change. Olson wrote that the allegations "wouldn't scuttle the entire theory of amyloid proteins", but "Selkoe told Science that they undercut the existence of the Aβ*56 protein that is central to Lesné's research." A Massachusetts General Hospital researcher, Rudolph E. Tanzi, said the alleged manipulation "had virtually zero effect on progress" in Alzheimer's research and characterized statements about its effect on the overall field and the amyloid hypothesis as "hyperbole".

USA Today states that experts have "downplayed" the impact the Nature paper had on drug discovery research. Alzheimer's researchers or organizations from Australia, France, and the UK state that the general theory behind the amyloid hypothesis remains valid. Selkoe, who Science describes as "a leading advocate of the amyloid and toxic oligomer hypotheses", opined that the "broader amyloid hypothesis remains viable" and referred to the alleged image manipulation as "what really looks like a very egregious example of malfeasance that's squarely in the Aβ oligomer field".

Sara Imarisio of Alzheimer's Research UK said: 
"These allegations are extremely serious. ... The amyloid protein is at the centre of the most influential theory of how Alzheimer's disease develops in the brain. But the research that has been called into question is focused on a very specific type of amyloid, and these allegations do not compromise the vast majority of knowledge built up during decades of research into the role of this protein in the disease."

The U.S. National Institute on Aging issued a statement saying:... the Aβ*56 oligomer was one of many being explored at the time ... immunotherapies targeting Aβ monomers (a single 'unit' of Aβ), other types of oligomers, and the longer amyloid fibrils have been the focus of studies ... there is still a strong scientific rationale for continuing to explore approaches that target different aspects and collections of the amyloid protein.

Legacy 
Writing in The Atlantic, David Grimes comments that the Lesné matter exemplifies the publish or perish dilemma, in which pressure to publish in academia can lead to wasted research dollars and inaccurate findings. Minnesota Public Radio linked instances of scientific misconduct to competition for funding.

Notes

References

External links
Personal
 Sylvain Lesné, University of Minnesota Medical School
 
 
 The Lesné Laboratory

Independent coverage
 Science podcast July 22, 2022, with Charles Piller, author of Science article
 Timeline from neurologylive.com

Alzheimer's disease researchers
French neuroscientists
University of Minnesota faculty
University of Caen Normandy alumni
Living people
1974 births
People from Calvados (department)